Merit Ptah is an impact crater on Venus, named in honor of alleged ancient Egyptian chief physician Merit Ptah whose existence was later exposed as a hoax. 

The only known real person by that name is the wife of Ramose (TT55), a governor of Thebes under Akhetaten.

References 

Impact craters on Venus